The Athens School of Fine Arts (ASFA; , literally: Highest School of Fine Arts), is Greece's premier Art school whose main objective is to develop the artistic talents of its students.

History
The Athens School of Fine Arts was established on 12 January 1837, known as the School for the Arts. In the beginning the School of Arts included three departments: the Crafts' School (part-time school), Industrial Crafts' School (full-time school) and Fine Arts School (full-time higher education).

The third department was the real ancestor of today’s School of Fine Arts and began to function as a daily school in 1840.  In this department subjects like painting, sculpture, architecture, lithography, woodcut, geometry and cartography were taught. The same year Duchess of Plaisance who lived in Greece contributed in upgrading the school. She enriched the school's program with new types of painting lessons and called the French painter Bonirote (one of Jean Auguste Dominique Ingres's students) in order to teach oil painting courses. Bonirote was a teacher there until 1843.

In 1843 with royal decree School of Fine Arts was promoted in a five-year study Higher Education School. Director of the School was the famous architect Lissandros Kautantzoglou. 
During the period 1844–1862 the studies' program was influenced by Europe's Academies of Fine Arts which taught neoclassicism. 
Some of the great students of this period finally became teachers in the school. Some of them are Nikiphoros Lytras and Nicholaos Gysis. 
In 1872, after a donation of George Averoff, a new building in Patission Avenue road was constructed that was later named National Technical University of Athens.

In 1910 the faculty acquired the independence from the named National Technical University. The same year the first four women were accepted to the School of Fine Arts.

In 1923, the new Director, Nikolaos Lytras (Nikiphoros' son), reorganized the workshops to give them more independence and promoted newer styles of painting.

In 1930, Education Minister Georgios Papandreou completely revamped and upgraded the old school, and gave it its current name (Ανώτατη Σχολή Καλών Τεχνών).

In 1929 Konstantinos Parthenis started teaching in the school. His lessons were mostly about the analysis of visual perception and the plastic transformation of the incoming visual information. Many other famous artists were occupied in Athens School of Fine Arts: the sculptor Costas Dimitriadis, the engraver Yannis Kefallinos, the writer and historian Pantelis Prebelakis. Since 1947 Yiannis Moralis, Georgios Mauroidis, Constantinos Grammatopoulos and Spyros Papaloukas, Panayiotis Tetsis, Nikos Kessanlis, Dimitris Mytaras, Georgios Nikolaidis, Ilias Dekoylakos and the architect Savvas Kontaratos taught the principles of Modern Greek art.

HQAA evaluation
An external evaluation of all academic departments in Greek universities will be conducted by the Hellenic Quality Assurance and Accreditation Agency (HQAA) in the following years.

Notable alumni

Vangelis (1943-), Composer and Painter
Athanase Apartis (1899–1972), sculptor
Venia Bechrakis (1974-), artist
Georgios Bonanos (1863–1940), sculptor
Yannoulis Chalepas (1851–1938), sculptor
Vasileios Hatzis (1870–1915), painter
Giorgio de Chirico (1888–1978), painter
Demetrios Farmakopoulos (1919–1996), painter
Alekos Fassianos (1935-), painter
Dimitrios Geraniotis (1871–1966), painter 
Giorgios Gounaropoulos (1890–1977), painter
Nikolaos Gyzis (1842–1901), painter
Georgios Jakobides (1853–1932), painter
Vaso Katraki (1914–1988), engraver
Aggelika Korovessi (1952-), sculptor
Ioannis Kossos (1822–1875), sculptor
 Lazaros Pandos (1958-), painter, photographer
Sophia Laskaridou (1882–1965), painter
Thanos Leivaditis (1934-2005), actor, screenwriter
Nikiforos Lytras (1832–1904), painter
 Michael Nikolinakos (1923-1994), actor, painter
Yiannis Maltezos (1913-1987), painter
Yiannis Moralis (1916–2009), painter
Dimitris Mytaras (1934-), painter
Aglaia Papa (1904–1984) 
Dimitris Papaioannou (1964-), choreographer, visual artist
Theodoros Papagiannis (1942-), sculptor
Heleni Polichronatou (1959-)
Georgios Prokopiou (1876–1940), painter
Georgios Roilos (1867–1928), painter
Michael Tombros (1889–1974), sculptor
Yannis Tsarouchis (1910–1989), painter
Spyridon Vikatos (1878–1960), painter
Spyros Vassiliou (1903–1985), painter
Androniqi Zengo Antoniu (1913-2000), painter
Sofia Zengo Papadhimitri (1915-1976), painter

See also
 List of universities in Greece
 List of research institutes in Greece
 National Technical University of Athens, the oldest Polytechnic University in Athens, which can trace its roots to the formation of the Industrial Crafts School in 1837.
 Education in Greece
 Academic grading in Greece

References

External links
Athens School of Fine Arts - Official website 
 Erasmus Charter for Higher Education 2014 - 2020   
 Athens School of Fine Arts Research Unit 
 Athens School of Fine Arts DASTA Office (Career Office & Innovation Unit) 
 Hellenic Quality Assurance and Accreditation Agency (HQAA) 
 "ATHENA" Plan for Higher Education  
 Greek Research & Technology Network (GRNET) 
 okeanos (GRNET's cloud service) 

 
Art schools in Greece
Greek art
Education in Athens
Culture in Athens
Educational institutions established in 1837
1837 establishments in Greece
Arts organizations established in 1837